{{DISPLAYTITLE:C5H10O3}}
The molecular formula C5H10O3 may refer to:

 Diethyl carbonate
 Ethyl lactate
 beta-Hydroxy beta-methylbutyric acid
 3-Hydroxypentanoic acid
 gamma-Hydroxyvaleric acid
 Roche ester